Rimularia is a genus of lichenized fungi in the family Trapeliaceae. Rimularia was circumscribed by Finnish botanist William Nylander in 1868.

Species
Rimularia actinostoma 
Rimularia albotessellata 
Rimularia applanata 
Rimularia aspicilioides 
Rimularia asteriphila 
Rimularia australis 
Rimularia austrolimborina 
Rimularia badioatra 
Rimularia campestris 
Rimularia cerebriformis 
Rimularia circumgrisea 
Rimularia coppinsiana 
Rimularia exigua 
Rimularia geumodoensis 
Rimularia gibbosa 
Rimularia globulispora 
Rimularia gyromuscosa 
Rimularia intercedens 
Rimularia limborina 
Rimularia maculata 
Rimularia michoacanensis 
Rimularia mullensis 
Rimularia paradoxa 
Rimularia psephota 
Rimularia ramboldiana 
Rimularia subconcava 
Rimularia umbratilis

References

Baeomycetales
Lichen genera
Taxa named by William Nylander (botanist)
Baeomycetales genera